Gmina Stężyca may refer to either of the following rural administrative districts in Poland:
Gmina Stężyca, Pomeranian Voivodeship
Gmina Stężyca, Lublin Voivodeship